David Hackston or Halkerstone (died 30 July 1680), was a militant Scottish Covenanter, remembered mainly for his part in the murder of Archbishop James Sharp of St. Andrews in 1679 and his involvement in the events of 1680 which led to his capture and execution.

Biography
Hackston belonged to a well-connected landowning family, the Hackstons or Halkerstones of Rathillet, in the parish of Kilmany, Fifeshire. He was the eldest son of James Hackston and Margaret, daughter of James Falconer of Craigfoodie, and inherited his father's estate in 1670. According to a parish minister writing in 1845, "It is not known whether he was born at the family seat. The records of the kirk-session do not go back so far". There is no indication that he was religious in his youth, but attendance at a 'field preaching' led him to cast in his lot with the Covenanters, becoming one of their most trusted leaders.

In 1679, he was asked to lead the party which had resolved to assassinate Archbishop Sharp, but declined "upon account of a difference subsisting betwixt Sharp and him in a civil process, wherein he judged himself to have been wronged by the primate, which deed he thought would give the world ground to think it was rather out of personal pique and revenge, which he professed he was free of". He agreed, however, to stand by the others and take the consequences. Accordingly, he sat at some distance from the action, while other members of the group, led by John Balfour of Kinloch, despatched Sharp on 3 May 1679.

One of the group, James Russell, later stated that one of Sharp's servants, "came to Rathillet, who was standing at a distance with his cloak about his mouth all the time on horseback, and desired him to come and cause save his life, who answered, as he meddled not with them nor desired them to take his life, so he durst not plead for him nor forbid them".

After the murder Hackston fled into the west country and took part in drawing up and publishing The Declaration and Testimony of the true Presbyterian Party in Scotland, which condemned the government's actions in religious affairs since the Restoration. On 29 May 1679, on the day chosen to celebrate the anniversary of the King's return to the throne, a party of Covenanters, Hackston among them, rode into Rutherglen, extinguished the bonfire in the main street and read the Declaration publicly before affixing it to the mercat cross. A new fire was then lit and Acts of Parliament and the Privy Council passed against the Covenanters since 1660 were consigned to the flames.

Hackston was also one of the commanders of the Covenanters who fought at the battle of Drumclog on 1 June, and again at Bothwell Bridge on 22 June 1679, where he was credited with heroically defending the bridge for up to an hour against superior forces led by the Duke of Monmouth. Having escaped from the battlefield, a reward of 10,000 merks was offered for his apprehension, obliging him to stay in hiding.

In July 1680, he reappeared as one of the armed followers who accompanied Richard Cameron at the issuing of the Sanquhar Declaration. At length, on 22 July 1680, he and about 60 of Cameron's followers were surprised by a body of dragoons at Airds Moss in Ayrshire. A skirmish ensued in which the Covenanters were worsted, and Hackston, apparently in the capacity of commander-in-chief and badly wounded, was taken prisoner and escorted to Edinburgh. The Privy Council instructed that:

Then, following a hearing before the Privy Council, at which he was indicted for the murder of Sharp, he appeared before the Justiciary and again before the Council which pronounced sentence, ordaining:

The execution took place on 30 July 1680. It seems that Hackston had a strong constitution, because, despite the loss of his hands and the disembowelling, it was claimed that his heart continued to beat for some time after it was on the executioner's knife.

Monuments
In the old churchyard at Cupar a tombstone commemorates three sufferers for the Covenant. It is inscribed thus : 

"Here lie interred the heads of Laur Hay : and Andrew Pitulloch, who suffered martyrdom at Edinburgh, July 13th, 1681, for adhering to the word of God, and Scotland's covenanted work of reformation ; and also one of the hands of David Hackston, of Rathillet, who was most cruelly martyred at Edinburgh, July 30th, 1680. 

Our persecutors filled with rage, 
Their brutish fury to assuage, 

Took heads and hands of martyrs off,  
That they might be the people's scoff. 

They Hackston's body cut asunder,  
And set it up a world's wonder 

In several places; to proclaim  
These monsters' glory and their shame."

References
Citations

Other sources

 

Attribution

Further reading
 contains a detailed account of Sharp's murder.
 contains Hackston's own account of his part in the fight at Airds Moss.
The account of James Russell who took part in the murder
 

Year of birth missing
1680 deaths
17th-century Scottish people
Scottish people convicted of murder
People executed for murder
People executed by the Kingdom of Scotland by hanging, drawing and quartering
Covenanters